Gilles Marchildon (born May 6, 1965) is a Canadian francophone activist and LGBT activist currently living in Toronto. He is currently Toronto campus director for Collège Boréal. Prior to that, he worked in the field of health as executive director of the French-language health planning agency Reflet Salvéo (now called Entité 3) from 2014 to 2019  and previously, from 2010 to 2014, as executive director of the community health agency Action Positive VIH/SIDA. He was president of ACFO Toronto and also vice-chair of the City of Toronto's French Language Advisory Committee. He continues to serve on Toronto's Advisory Committee on Seniors Services and Long-Term Care. He also sits on the board of the provincial community foundation, la Fondation Franco-ontarienne, where he was elected president.

He was executive director of Egale Canada during the organization's campaign to obtain recognition of equal civil marriage rights (2003 to 2006). In addition, he is one of the three founding directors of the International Railroad for Queer Refugees, and served as its first president from 2008 to 2011. He has also worked as drector of communications for the HIV Legal Network from 2009 to 2010 and for World University Service of Canada from 2006 to 2008.

A native of Penetanguishene, Ontario, Marchildon studied political science at the University of Ottawa, and was president of the Student Federation of the University of Ottawa in 1987–88. He later lived in Paris and Toronto before moving to Winnipeg, where he established his own communications and marketing firm, People and Ideas, and served on the boards of several community organizations for both the lesbian, gay, bisexual and transgender and Franco-Manitoban communities in Winnipeg, including the Reel Pride film festival and the Winnipeg Film Group. He served as editor and publisher of Swerve, Winnipeg's LGBT magazine, for four years, and also wrote for Xtra! and Icon magazines in Toronto.

References

1965 births
Journalists from Manitoba
Journalists from Ontario
Canadian LGBT rights activists
Canadian gay writers
Writers from Winnipeg
University of Ottawa alumni
Franco-Ontarian people
Franco-Manitoban people
Living people
People from Penetanguishene
Canadian LGBT journalists